Events in the year 2022 in Barbados.

Incumbents 

 President: Sandra Mason 
 Prime Minister: Mia Mottley

Events 
Ongoing – COVID-19 pandemic in Barbados

 20 January – Mia Mottley and her Barbados Labour Party government are re-elected for a second term in a landslide, winning all 30 seats.

Deaths

References 

 
2020s in Barbados
Years of the 21st century in Barbados
Barbados
Barbados